Marfo is a Ghanaian surname. Notable people with this surname include:

 Clement Marfo & The Frontline
 Darryl Marfo (born 1990), Scottish rugby player
 Edward Oppong Marfo, Ghanaian journalist
 Emmanuel Marfo, Ghanaian politician
 Kevin Marfo (born 1997), American basketball player
 Nana Amaniampong Marfo (born 1957), Ghanaian politician
 Rex Owusu Marfo, also known as Rex Omar, Ghanaian artist